William Hewlett may refer to:

 Bill Hewlett (1913–2001), American engineer and co-founder of the Hewlett-Packard Company
 Will Hewlett (1876–1921), Welsh trade unionist and socialist activist
William Hewlett (regicide), officer involved in the execution of Charles I of England in 1649
W. H. Hewlett (1873–1940), Canadian composer, organist, and choir conductor

See also
William Hewett
William Hewitt (disambiguation)